Grace Ly (born in 1979) is a French writer, podcaster and anti-racist and feminist activist.

Early life
Ly's parents are Cambodian Chinese. They fled the Khmer Rouge regime and arrived to France in the 1970s. In Grenoble, her father initially ran an Asian food restaurant. Ly and her family were the only Asians in their neighborhood. When Ly was 6 years old, her family moved to Paris. 
Ly studied law and subsequently worked for eight years for an entertainment company, in France and in London. She however did not find the corporate job fulfilling.

Focus on stereotypes about Asians
In 2011, Ly launched the blog Petite Banane (Little Banana) dedicated to food.
The blog evolved from food to also discuss racial stereotypes that are associated with Asian food and Asian communities more broadly. This led Ly to launch the web-series Ça reste entre nous (It Stays Between Us).
In her work, Ly denounces the model minority myth and the corrosive effect of positive stereotypes often associated with the Asian community in France. Imitating accents is one form of casual racism that Ly considers as offensive.
Ly's first novel Une jeune fille modèle (A model young girl) was published in 2018. The book is a work of fiction inspired by her personal story.

Anti-racist work
In 2018 Ly launched the podcast Kiffe Ta Race (Love Your Race) together with the French journalist Rokhaya Diallo.
Ly cites among her influences author Chimamanda Ngozi Adichie.

References

External links 
 Official blog

1979 births
Anti-racism
Ethnic and racial stereotypes
French anti-racism activists
French feminist writers
21st-century French novelists
21st-century French women writers
Living people